Kubecka is a surname. Notable people with the surname include:

Chris Kubecka, American computer security researcher and cyberwarfare specialist
Robert Kubecka, American undercover informant murdered by mob related to Salvatore Avellino

See also
Kubeck